Marzoli is an Italian surname. Notable people with the surname include:

 Ruggero Marzoli, an Italian professional road bicycle racer
 Samuele Marzoli, an Italian former professional road and track cyclist

See also
Mazzoli

References

Italian-language surnames